The chinkara (Gazella bennettii), also known as the Indian gazelle, is a gazelle species native to Iran, Afghanistan, Pakistan and India.

Taxonomy
The following six subspecies are considered valid:
 Deccan chinkara (G. b. bennettii) (Sykes 1831) – ranges from South India, from the Ganges Valley (east to the borders of West Bengal) south at least to Hyderabad, Andhra Pradesh, Deccan Plateau;
 Gujarat chinkara (G. b. christii) (Blyth, 1842) – ranges from the desert lowlands of Pakistan, western India, Rann of Kutch, Kathiawar, Saurastra region and as far east of Ahmedabad district in Gujarat;
 Kennion gazelle, eastern jebeer gazelle or Baluchistan gazelle (G. b. fuscifrons) (Blanford, 1873) – occurs in eastern Iran, (southeast and along the Makran coast, Sistan and Baluchistan) southern Afghanistan, Pakistan, Balochistan Province to Sindh and northwestern India, Rajasthan, also the darkest subspecies;
 Bushehr gazelle (G. b. karamii) (Groves, 1993) – ranges in northeastern Iran, restricted near Bushehr, also the smallest subspecies;
 Jebeer gazelle, western jebeer gazelle or Shikari gazelle (G. b. shikarii) (Groves, 1993) – Lives in northeastern Iran, north and west-central districts (Touran, west to Tehran and southwest to Shiraz County and beyond), also the palest subspecies;
 Salt Range gazelle (G. b. salinarum) (Groves, 2003) – ranges in Pakistan, Punjab region and east as far as Delhi, Indian Punjab, Haryana in northwest India, salt range;

Characteristics

It has a reddish-buff summer coat with smooth, glossy fur. In winter, the white belly and throat fur is in greater contrast. The sides of the face have dark chestnut stripes from the corner of the eye to the muzzle, bordered by white stripes.

Distribution and habitat 
Chinkara live in arid plains and hills, deserts, dry scrub and light forests. They inhabit more than 80 protected areas in India. In Iran, their largest  population is the Kavir National Park.

In 2001, the Indian chinkara population was estimated at 100,000 with 80,000 living in the Thar Desert. The population in Pakistan is scattered, and has been severely reduced by hunting. Also in Iran, the population is fragmented. In Afghanistan, chinkaras are probably very rare.

Ecology

Chinkaras are shy and avoid human habitation. They can go without water for long periods and can get sufficient fluids from plants and dew droplets that get deposited on the plant surface in the night. Although most are seen alone, they can sometimes be spotted in groups of up to four animals.

Chinkaras are preyed upon by Indian leopards, Bengal tigers, Asiatic lions and dholes. The chinkara was a common prey of the Asiatic cheetah in India alongside blackbucks. Outside protected areas they may be attacked by pariah dogs, and both Indian wolves and golden jackals are also known to hunt them.

Conservation 
The chinkara occurs in over 80 protected areas in India.  In January 2016, the Karnataka government issued a notification to establish a sanctuary especially for chinkara in the Yadahalli village in the Bagalkot district of the state. This region shelters a major population of chinkara. The Karnataka Government also notified the Bukkapatna Chinkara Wildlife Sanctuary in Tumakuru district in May 2019. The chinkara is protected in that's distribution areas of Iran and five of Pakistan.

Threats
The chinkara is threatened by extensive hunting for meat and trophies in Afghanistan, Iran and Pakistan. Other threats include habitat loss due to agricultural and industrial expansion. The status in these countries is unclear. Around 1,300 individuals occur in Iran. However, the situation in India is not so grim; in 2001, populations were estimated at over one million in the country, of which nearly 80,000 occur in the Thar desert, with a stable population trend. It has been listed as a species of least concern on the IUCN Red List.

In 1993, a controversy erupted when the Gujarat government issued a decree to denotify the Narayan Sarovar Sanctuary, that contains a small population of chinkara, to allow mining of lignite, limestone, bentonite and bauxite inside the sanctuary. This was, however, rejected by the Gujarat High Court, and the sanctuary was restored to its earlier limits.

See also
 Yadahalli Chinkara Wildlife Sanctuary

References

External links

Gazella
Mammals described in 1831
Herbivorous mammals
Fauna of Rajasthan
Mammals of India
Mammals of Pakistan
Mammals of the Middle East
Fauna of the Thar Desert
Fauna of Sindh
Symbols of Rajasthan